Chasmatosuchus was an archosauriform reptile from the early Triassic period of European Russia. One of the earliest described archosauriforms, it was over 2 m long and is thought to have behaved like a modern crocodile. Its mouth had two distinct features: the top of its jaw hooked downwards to aid in holding prey, and the upper palate was lined with a row of teeth—a primitive feature lost in later archosaurs.

Chasmatosuchus was formerly assigned to Proterosuchidae, but a 2016 cladistic analysis by Martin Ezcurra couldn't confidently place the species of Chasmatosuchus within Proterosuchidae. Instead their position remains unresolved due to the fragmentary nature of the known material, however Chasmatosuchus is more likely to be intermediate between proterosuchids and erythrosuchids and possibly closely related to Sarmatosuchus otschevi and Cuyosuchus huenei. Ezcurra (2016) could only placed C. rossicus and C. magnus within Chasmatosuchus with certainty, while the third valid species"C." vjushkovi potentially does not belong to Chasmatosuchus and may represent a proterosuchid. Gamosaurus and Jaikosuchus are subjective junior synonyms of Chasmatosuchus. Chasmatosuchus parvus, based on an anterior cervical vertebra, was synonymized with Macrocnemus in 1995.

References

Prehistoric archosauriforms
Early Triassic reptiles of Europe
Fossil taxa described in 1940
Prehistoric reptile genera